Brunswick was launched in Maine in 1827. She completed twelve whaling voyages before  burnt her in the Bering Straits in June 1865 on Brunswicks 13th voyage.

Career
It is currently unclear what Brunswick did between her launch in 1827 and her first voyage as a whaler in 1834. As a whaler, most of her whale hunting took place in the North Pacific, though she also hunted in the South Pacific and the Indian Ocean on occasion. All the data below is from the American Whaling Voyages Database.

Fate
On 28 June CSS Shenandoah burnt Brunswick in Bering Straits Narrows. Brunswick was one of ten vessels Shenandoah captured on that day, most of which she burnt.

Citations

1827 ships
Ships built in Maine
Age of Sail merchant ships of the United States
Whaling ships
Captured ships
Maritime incidents in June 1865